Georges Bordonove (25 May 1920, Enghien-les-Bains, Seine-et-Oise – 16 March 2007, Antony, Hauts-de-Seine) was a French biographer and novelist.

Biography 
Bordonove was a prolific writer of both books on history for a general readership and historical novels. His biographies, such as those of the kings of France, are characterised by short, dense chapters packed with detail including a potentially bewildering array of names and the citation of recorded conversations, sometimes in Old French with translations, but showing an evident sympathy for the subject, a desire to make a complete picture of his life and thought, and some sly humour. However, his 1980s series Les Rois qui ont fait la France (The Kings who Made France) has been called "more hagiographic than strictly historical". In his obituary in Le Monde, Philippe-Jean Catinchi wrote: "Despite his vision rarely conforming to the state of historical research, the public approved" and noted that he also contributed to a historical survey of everyday life.

He was a member of the sustaining committee of the royalist Association Unité capétienne (Capetian Unity Society) and of the jury awarding its Hugues-Capet Prize.

He is buried in the cemetery of Le Château-d'Oléron on the island of Oléron.

Honours 

 Officier (Officer) of the Légion d'honneur
 Award from the Académie française for novel Les Quatre Cavaliers and historical study Les Marins de l'An II
 Prix Goncourt for history for Le Naufrage de 'La Méduse'
 Grand prix des libraires (Booksellers' award)

References

1920 births
2007 deaths
People from Enghien-les-Bains
20th-century French novelists
French biographers
20th-century French male writers
Officiers of the Légion d'honneur
20th-century biographers
French male essayists
French male novelists
20th-century French essayists
Winners of the Prix Broquette-Gonin (literature)
Prix des libraires winners
Male biographers